Nersisian School (Nersisian Dprots; ,) was an Armenian higher education institution in the city of Tiflis, then Russian Empire (now Tbilisi, Georgia). It operated exactly for one century, from 1824 to 1924. It was founded by Bishop Nerses V Ashtaraketsi, Armenian primate of the diocese of Georgia (later Catholicos of All Armenians Nerses V), after whom it was named.

History 
In the 19th century Tiflis (Tbilisi) was a major Armenian cultural center with a large Armenian population. Numerous Armenian schools, various publications, drama associations and societies, charities and nonprofit organizations functioned in the city. The Nersisian School officially opened in 1824 and throughout its existence it had a unique role in Eastern Armenian education.

In 1905, the school was destroyed in a bombing. Afterward, Alexander Mantashev solved all the school's financial problems with the designing and building of the school by a Russian-Armenian military architect Nikita Lazarev. The façade of the building was built of an orange stone from the Tsater (Lori) and Karahunj (Zangezur) villages. Alexander Mantashev spent 370,000 rubles (444 kg/gold) during the construction of the new building. In front of the school stood statues of Nerses Ashtaraketsi and Alexander Mantashev.

Notable alumni
The following is the list of notable alumni of the Nersisian School with the year of graduation in parenthesis:
Khachatur Abovian (born 1826), writer
Perch Proshyan (born 1856), writer
Derenik Demirchian (born 1898), writer and novelist
Karo Halabyan (born 1917), architect
Yervand Kochar (born 1918), sculptor
Anastas Mikoyan, Soviet statesman
Soghomon Tehlirian, assassin of Talaat Pasha, one of the main perpetrators of the Armenian Genocide
Arshak Ter-Gukasov, Russian Armenian military commander
Hayk Bzhishkyan, military commander
Gabriel Sundukian, writer and playwright
Nikol Aghbalian, historian
Artashes Abeghyan, philologist, historian and politician

Not graduated
Ghazaros Aghayan, writer, educator and folklorist (1853–1854)
Hovhannes Tumanyan, writer (1883–1887)

See also 
Armenians in Tbilisi
Education in Armenia
Gevorgian Seminary
Vaskenian Theological Academy
Education in Georgia

References 

Armenian schools
Armenian diaspora in Georgia (country)
History of Tbilisi
Oriental Orthodox schools
Educational institutions established in 1824
1824 establishments in the Russian Empire
1824 establishments in Georgia (country)
Educational institutions disestablished in 1924
1924 disestablishments in Georgia (country)
1924 disestablishments in the Soviet Union